The Agassiz Brewing Company was a Canadian brewery, founded by former Fort Garry Brewing Company brewmaster Gary De Pape. The company was established in 1998 in Winnipeg, Manitoba and based there until 2010. It was named for the prehistoric glacial Lake Agassiz which once covered much of Manitoba. Agassiz beer was available in Manitoba, Saskatchewan, Ontario, and British Columbia.

History 
Agassiz Brewing Company was founded by former Fort Garry Brewing Brewmaster Gary De Pape. It was established in Winnipeg in late 1998 and opened on March 17, 1999. Agassiz was one of a trio of microbreweries, the others being Fort Garry and Two Rivers Brewing, that launched in Manitoba in the late 1990s to produce and bottle locally made ales and lagers for the Winnipeg and Manitoba market.
Agassiz did very well during its first year, launching its version of a Mild Ale with Catfish Cream Ale as its flagship brand. It also released a Bohemian styled lager with its Premium Pilsner. Later it released Canada's first ever packaged German Hefeweizen with Harvest Haze Hefeweizen. That beer had tremendous and instant success. At the end of its first year, Agassiz launched a Bock Beer, made with orange peel and Manitoba honey in a limited edition six pack that sold out in hours. 
De Pape was the first Manitoba brewer to enter the American market when he signed a tri-state distribution agreement for North Dakota, South Dakota and parts of Minnesota with the Miller Distributor, Beverage Wholesalers. 
But after pressure from his shareholders steered the company into a different direction, De Pape left to pursue other interests.  As per that US distribution agreement, once De Pape left, Beverage Wholesalers wanted nothing to do with Agassiz and the contract ended. Immediately after, Manitoba and Saskatchewan sales of its beers dropped and Agassiz Brewing had difficulty covering operating costs as it was only selling a small volume, of its 600,000 litre capacity.
After considering several options, including approaching rival Fort Garry, it closed its Winnipeg operation on January 31, 2002, sold its assets and went bankrupt to re-emerge as a contract brewer, known as New Manitoba Brewing Ltd. New Manitoba handled marketing, sales, and distribution, leaving brewing and packaging to Northern Breweries of Sudbury, Ontario.
New Manitoba then came to terms with Fort Garry on a co-packing arrangement. On October 15, 2004, New Manitoba signed an agreement with its former rival for that company to warehouse, distribute and market Agassiz brands.
Fort Garry ended that relationship in January 2010, saying they were too busy with their own brands to have room in their tanks for Agassiz's last brand, Catfish Cream Ale.
Joe Constant, a partner in New Manitoba, said he and his partners tried unsuccessfully to get other small breweries to take on brewing Catfish.

Former Brands 
 Catfish Cream Ale (5% alcohol by volume)
 Bison Blonde Lager (4.8%), a helles-style lager
 Dark Lager, a Munich dark lager
 Winnipeg Kolsch (available on tap only)
 Harvest Haze Hefeweizen

See also 
 Beer in Canada
 List of breweries, wineries, and distilleries in Manitoba

References 

Defunct breweries of Canada
Manufacturing companies based in Winnipeg
Food and drink companies established in 1998
Food and drink companies disestablished in 2010
1998 establishments in Manitoba
2010 disestablishments in Manitoba
Canadian companies established in 1998
Cuisine of Manitoba
Defunct companies based in Winnipeg
Beer brewing companies based in Manitoba